Oleksiy Zinkevych (born 12 May 1997) is a professional Ukrainian football midfielder who plays for Nyva Ternopil.

Career
Zinkevych began his playing career in the sportive school in Volodymyr-Volynskyi. Next he was close for signing contract with FC Volyn Lutsk in the Ukrainian Premier League. He made his debut in the Ukrainian Premier League for FC Volyn on 14 July 2013, playing in a match against FC Dynamo Kyiv.

References

External links
Profile at Official FFU Site (Ukr)

Living people
1997 births
People from Volodymyr-Volynskyi
Ukrainian footballers
Association football midfielders
Ukrainian Premier League players
FC Volyn Lutsk players
FC Shakhtar Donetsk players
FC Ahrobiznes Volochysk players
FC Chornomorets Odesa players
FC Nyva Ternopil players
Sportspeople from Volyn Oblast